Kokia lanceolata, the Wailupe Valley treecotton, was a species of flowering plant in the family Malvaceae. It was the only species of Kokia to occur on the island of Oahu and originally known from the hills of Makapu'u, Koko Head and Wailupe Valley. It became extinct not long after its discovery in the 1880s, most likely due to grazing pressure from cattle and goat ranching.

References

lanceolata
Biota of Oahu
Endemic flora of Hawaii
Extinct flora of Hawaii
Plant extinctions since 1500
Taxonomy articles created by Polbot